Dante Leverock (born 11 April 1992) is a Bermudian professional footballer who plays for Robin Hood and the Bermuda national team.

Club career
Leverock played for local side Dandy Town Hornets before joining the Bermuda Hogges in the USL Second Division in summer 2011. In August 2012, Leverock got himself a scholarship at St. Mary's University College in London, leaving Dandy Town Hornets again for English side Staines Town in the process. After picking up an injury, he moved to Leatherhead in 2013.

In winter 2014–15, Leverock trained with Baltimore Blast before joining Harrisburg City Islanders for the 2015 season.

In 2018, Leverock signed with JK Narva Trans, a professional football club in Estonia, that competes in the highest division of Estonian football. During his first month, Leverock was named by Premium Liiga Soccernet.ee as part of the best eleven players for the month of March.

In December 2018, Leverock signed for Sligo Rovers and was a member of the first team squad for the 2019 season. After on season with Rovers, it was announced that Leverock has left the club.

After one season in Ireland, Leverock signed for Polish second division side Radomiak Radom in February 2020. He left Radomiak at the end of the 2019–20 season without making any appearances for the club. In September 2020, he returned to Bermuda to sign with Robin Hood.

International career 
Leverock received his first international cap for Bermuda on 8 March 2015 in a friendly match against Grenada and has, as of June 2019, earned a total of twenty caps, scoring three goals. He has represented his country in four FIFA World Cup qualification matches. On May 18, 2021, Leverock announced he was retiring from international football. However, four weeks later, he reversed his decision and was named to the Bermudan provisional squad for 2021 CONCACAF Gold Cup qualification.

International goals 
Scores and results list Bermuda's goal tally first.

Personal life
He is a cousin of former MLS player Khano Smith.

References

External links 
 
 
 Player profile – Harrisburg City Islanders
 
 Dante Leverock Interview

1992 births
Living people
People from Hamilton Parish
Association football defenders
Bermudian footballers
Bermuda international footballers
Bermuda Hogges F.C. players
Dandy Town Hornets F.C. players
Staines Town F.C. players
Leatherhead F.C. players
Sligo Rovers F.C. players
Penn FC players
JK Narva Trans players
Radomiak Radom players
USL League Two players
USL Championship players
League of Ireland players
Meistriliiga players
Bermudian expatriate footballers
Expatriate soccer players in the United States
Expatriate footballers in Estonia
Expatriate footballers in Poland
2019 CONCACAF Gold Cup players
Bermuda youth international footballers
Bermuda under-20 international footballers
Bermudian expatriate sportspeople in the United States
Bermudian expatriate sportspeople in Estonia
Bermudian expatriate sportspeople in Poland